314 may refer to:

 The year 314
 314 (number)
 Boeing 314
 In Buffy the Vampire Slayer, 314 is a reference to a top-secret government program created to produce man/machine/demon hybrid super soldiers such as Adam.